These are the Canadian number-one albums of 2020. The chart is compiled by Nielsen SoundScan and published in Billboard magazine as Top Canadian Albums.

Number-one albums

See also
List of Canadian Hot 100 number-one singles of 2020
List of number-one digital songs of 2020 (Canada)

References

External links
 Billboard Top Canadian Albums

2020
Canada Albums
2020 in Canadian music